Arthur Augusto de Matos Soares (born 17 March 2003), simply known as Arthur, is a Brazilian professional footballer who plays as a right back for América Mineiro.

Career
Born in Belo Horizonte, Minas Gerais, Arthur joined América Mineiro's youth setup in 2019, after starting it out at Dínamo de Araxá. On 29 November of that year, he was loaned to Flamengo, with a buyout clause.

Arthur returned to América in 2021, and was promoted to the first team in December 2021. He made his senior debut on 25 January 2022, starting in a 1–2 Campeonato Mineiro away loss against Caldense.

Arthur made his Série A debut on 15 May 2022, coming on as a half-time substitute for Índio Ramírez in a 0–1 away loss against Coritiba.

Career statistics

Honours

International
Brazil U20
South American U-20 Championship: 2023

References

2003 births
Living people
Footballers from Belo Horizonte
Brazilian footballers
Association football defenders
Campeonato Brasileiro Série A players
América Futebol Clube (MG) players
Brazil youth international footballers